Fremont County Courthouse may refer to:

Fremont County Courthouse (Idaho), St. Anthony, Idaho
Fremont County Courthouse (Iowa), Sidney, Iowa